Nicole Arendt and Manon Bollegraf were the defending champions but lost in the semifinals to Gigi Fernández and Mary Joe Fernández.

Jana Novotná and Arantxa Sánchez Vicario won in the final 6–2, 6–3 against the Fernándezes.

Seeds
Champion seeds are indicated in bold text while text in italics indicates the round in which those seeds were eliminated.

 Jana Novotná /  Arantxa Sánchez Vicario (champions)
 Gigi Fernández /  Mary Joe Fernández (final)
 Meredith McGrath /  Larisa Neiland (semifinals)
 Nicole Arendt /  Manon Bollegraf (semifinals)

Draw

External links
 1996 Family Circle Cup Doubles draw

Charleston Open
1996 WTA Tour